The Daily Guardian is an English-language newspaper circulating in Iloilo City, Philippines, with its intended audience being the Western Visayas region and with a specific focus on the provinces of Iloilo, Guimaras, Aklan, Capiz, Antique and Negros Occidental. It was founded in 2000 by Kayo and Partners, a publishing firm based in Iloilo City. Lemuel Fernandez is its publisher while Francis Allan L. Angelo is its current editor-in-chief.

External links
 Official Website

Daily newspapers published in the Philippines
Newspapers published in Iloilo
Companies based in Iloilo City
Newspapers established in 2000